Billakurru is a village in East Godavari district of Andhra Pradesh, India.

Geography
It has an average elevation of 8 meters (29 feet).

References

Villages in East Godavari district